Paraguay competed at the 2014 Winter Olympics in Sochi, Russia from 7 to 23 February 2014. Paraguay made its debut at the Winter Olympics. The Paraguayan team consisted of one athlete competing in freestyle skiing.

Competitors

Freestyle skiing 

According to the final quota allocation released on 20 January 2014, Paraguay has one athlete in qualification position. Julia Marino was born in Paraguay but was adopted by an American family at the age of six months, and has lived there ever since. Marino had to go through the process of creating the Paraguayan ski federation and be released from the American team before officially qualifying to compete for the country.

Julia Marino competed in the women's slopestyle qualification round and finished in 17th place overall (out of 22 athletes), which was not good enough to advance. When asked about competing at the 2018 Winter Olympics she replied that she was still young and would 100% compete for Paraguay. With a single athlete competing in a single event, the country did not win a medal at these Games.

References

External links 
Paraguay at the 2014 Winter Olympics

Nations at the 2014 Winter Olympics
2014
2014 in Paraguayan sport